Bill Dance (born William George Dance, Jr.; October 7, 1940) is an angler and host of Bill Dance Outdoors, a fishing television series on the Outdoor Channel, and Bill Dance Saltwater on the Sportsman Channel.

Biography 
Raised in Lynchburg, Tennessee, Dance considered becoming a doctor, but changed his mind after happening upon a grisly motorcycle accident in the early 1960s. He then turned his focus to competing in bass tournaments. A fishing lure manufacturer that sponsored him suggested he should start a TV show to promote the product. The program originally began on WHBQ-TV, then the ABC affiliate in Memphis, in 1968.

Dance's signature look includes sunglasses and a Tennessee Volunteers baseball cap.  He received his first cap from their coach, Doug Dickey, in the late 1960s.  He lives in Eads, with his wife, Dianne.

With fellow fishermen Roland Martin and Jimmy Houston, he formed the company Th3 Legends to sell signature products.

Achievements 
 1969 Barry Hamilton World Gut Hook Champion 
 Member, International Game Fish Association's Hall of Fame
 1970, 1974, 1977: B.A.S.S. Angler of the Year.
 23 National Bass Fishing titles and 7 B.A.S.S. titles.
 Caught first bass in B.A.S.S. history.
 1986: National Freshwater Hall of Fame.

References 

American fishers
Angling writers
1940 births
Living people
People from Collierville, Tennessee
People from Shelby County, Tennessee
People from Lynchburg, Tennessee